Isleworth railway station is in the London Borough of Hounslow, in west London, and is in Travelcard Zone 4. It is 19 km (12 mi) west-southwest of London Waterloo. The unmanned station and all trains serving it are operated by South Western Railway.

History
A temporary station east of Wood Lane, 400 metres east-northeast of the current site, opened as "Hounslow" on 22 August 1849 to allow a service to run until the bridges, embankment, and station buildings were completed. The name was changed to "Smallberry Green" after four months. 
The present station opened on 1 February 1850 as "Isleworth". It was renamed Spring Grove & Isleworth in 1855 and reverted to Isleworth in August 1911.

Amenities and set-up
The two facing platform lengths at Isleworth are constrained by a bridge over a road at each end and front-seven-doors opening is used for most rolling stock.  Forerunner 8-car slam door trains fitted the platform lengths, as at two other stations along the line.  A commercial street adjoins the station becoming Hounslow High Street within 500 metres, to the west.  The more suburban district of Isleworth is primarily south-west of the station, comprising the "Woodlands" or "Worton" estate and a medieval riverside hub of Old Isleworth for which the railway station is the same distance as Syon Lane.  Those parts of Isleworth north and east tend to be termed Spring Grove.

Services 
The typical off-peak service from the station in trains per hour is:
 4 direct to Waterloo via 
 2 circuitously to Waterloo via  and Richmond
 2 to 

On Sundays two trains per hour run to and from London Waterloo, one of which continues to Woking and the other to Twickenham, and following stations back to Waterloo including Kingston and Wimbledon.

Service expansion schemes
Two early 21st century proposals short of political pledge stage, or Network Rail proposals, exist for the Hounslow Loop Line, further details of which are mentioned at Syon Lane.

Connections
London Buses routes 117, 235, 237, E8, H37, and night route N9 serve the station.

References

External links 

Railway stations in the London Borough of Hounslow
Former London and South Western Railway stations
Railway stations in Great Britain opened in 1850
Railway stations served by South Western Railway
Railway station